Miles Brown (born December 28, 2004), also known by his stage name Baby Boogaloo, is an American actor, dancer and rapper. He is best known for his role as Jack Johnson in the ABC comedy series Black-ish.

Life and career
Brown is the son of rapper Wildchild and Cyndee Brown. He has an older sister. Brown's father is African-American, while his mother is of Filipino and Mexican descent.

As a young child, he danced in music videos—including "Yeah 3x" and "Loving You Is Killing Me"—and on the children's show Yo Gabba Gabba!. At the age of 5, he was a guest on The Ellen DeGeneres Show and a contestant on the fifth season of America's Got Talent as part of the dance duo Future Funk. His first role in a feature film was as part of the Little Rascals Intro Battle Crew in the dance-drama movie Battlefield America. Brown was also in a dance group called Alias Dance Company from 2010 to 2014.

In 2014, Brown was cast opposite Anthony Anderson and Tracee Ellis Ross in the ABC comedy series Black-ish created by Kenya Barris. For his role as Jack Johnson on the show, he has been nominated for four NAACP Image Awards, two Screen Actors Guild Awards, and the BET YoungStars Award. He won a Young Artist Award for Best Performance in a TV Series - Supporting Young Actor.

Between 2014 and 2016, Brown appeared in several short films. He and Marsai Martin, who plays his twin sister on Black-ish, voice the recurring characters of siblings Jack and Jill on Goldie & Bear. Brown danced in Cirque du Soleil's annual benefit show, One Night for One Drop.

In 2018, Brown was cast in the main role of the indie film Boy Genius alongside Rita Wilson. Later that year, he released his first single, "NBA," and competed on the first season of Dancing with the Stars: Juniors. He was named one of Hollywood's top 30 stars under 18 by The Hollywood Reporter. In October 2020, Brown released his debut album We the Future, with production from Madlib, Mic Checkmate and Deliv; as well as features from Jidenna, Slick Rick, Siedah Garrett, Dame D.O.L.L.A. and his father Wildchild.

Brown is the youngest member of the Jr. NBA Leadership Council.

Filmography

Film

Music Videos

Television

Discography
 We the Future (2020)

Awards and nominations

References

External links
 

Living people
Male actors from Oxnard, California
American male film actors
American male television actors
American male child actors
21st-century American male actors
2004 births
African-American male actors